The Neil Diamond Collection is a 1999 compilation album by Neil Diamond. In 2003, the album was ranked number 222 on Rolling Stone magazine's list of the 500 greatest albums of all time, and ranked 224 as of 2012. It was dropped from the list in the 2020 edition.

Track listing
"He Ain't Heavy, He's My Brother" written by Bob Russell and Bobby Scott; all other titles written by Neil Diamond.

References

Neil Diamond compilation albums

1999 compilation albums
MCA Records compilation albums